Longyearbyen Community Council is the local government for Longyearbyen in Svalbard, Norway. It has many of the same responsibilities of a municipality. It is organized with a 15-member council which since 2011 has been led by Mayor Christin Kristoffersen of the Labour Party. The council's main responsibilities are infrastructure and utilities, including power, land-use and community planning, education from kindergarten to upper secondary level and child welfare. It operates three kindergartens in addition to the 13-grade Longyearbyen School.

The Svalbard Council was established on 1 November 1971. It consisted of 17 non-partisan members which were elected or appointed in three different groups—Store Norske Spitsbergen Kulkompani (SNSK) employees, government employees and others, although the ratio changed several times. Svalbard Samfunnsdrift  (SSD), a limited company which was responsible for public infrastructure and services, was established by SNSK on 1 January 1989. Responsibilities included healthcare, the fire department, the kindergarten, roads, garbage disposal, power production, the water and sewer system, the cinema, cultural activities and the library. Ownership was taken over by the Ministry of Trade and Industry on 1 January 1993. During the 1990s, the authorities started a process to "normalize" Longyearbyen by abolishing the company town scheme and introducing a full range of services, a varied economy and local democracy. The Svalbard Council changed its regulations from 1993 and allowed parties to run for election. Longyearbyen Community Council was established in 2002, replacing the Svalbard Council and assimilating SSD.

References
Bibliography

Notes

External links
 Official website

Longyearbyen
2002 establishments in Norway
Organisations based in Longyearbyen
Government of the Arctic